Vardavard, also rendered as Var Davad or Vardavad or Vardavar or Vard Avard or Vardavud or Varood, may refer to:
 Vardavard-e Olya, Hamadan Province
 Vardavard-e Sofla, Hamadan Province
 Vardavard-e Vosta, Hamadan Province
 Vardavard Metro Station, in Tehran